Troglothele is a monotypic genus of Caribbean brushed trapdoor spiders containing the single species, Troglothele coeca. It was first described by L. Fage in 1929, and has only been found in Cuba.

References

Barychelidae
Monotypic Mygalomorphae genera
Spiders of the Caribbean
Endemic fauna of Cuba